Gianluca Conte (born 28 May 1965) is an Italian professional football assistant manager, analyst and former player. He is currently a technical & analytics coach for English club Tottenham Hotspur under his brother Antonio Conte.

Playing as a defender, Conte began his career at local club U.S. Lecce. Conte played from the bench and didn't manage to break into the first team. Later he studied the University of Foggia, in sport science, and followed his brother into a managerial role. 
 His managerial career started in 2007, assisting his brother to lead Bari to the 2008–09 Serie B title, and Siena to promotion from the same division two years later. He then arrived at Juventus in 2011. Winning three consecutive Serie A titles as an assistant manager, he then followed his brother again in taking charge of the Italian national team in 2014 until the UEFA Euro 2016 campaign.

Club career
Conte began his career with the youth team of his hometown club U.S. Lecce. Conte made 9 appearances for the Salentini in their maiden campaign in the Serie A. Failing to crack the first team, Conte finished his career to pursue a sport science degree.

Honours

Assistant manager
Bari
Serie B: 2008–09

Juventus
Serie A (3): 2011–12, 2012–13, 2013–14
Supercoppa Italiana (2): 2012, 2013

Chelsea
Premier League: 2016–17
FA Cup: 2018

Inter Milan
Serie A: 2020–21

References

Living people
Sportspeople from Lecce
Italian footballers
Italian football managers
U.S. Lecce players
Association football defenders
S.S.C. Bari non-playing staff
A.C.N. Siena 1904 non-playing staff
Juventus F.C. non-playing staff
Italy national football team non-playing staff
Chelsea F.C. non-playing staff
Inter Milan non-playing staff
Tottenham Hotspur F.C. non-playing staff
1972 births
Footballers from Apulia
Association football coaches